Mesyagutovo is the name of two rural localities in the Republic of Bashkortostan, Russia:
Mesyagutovo, Duvansky District, Republic of Bashkortostan, a selo in Duvansky District
Mesyagutovo, Yanaulsky District, Republic of Bashkortostan, a selo in Yanaulsky District